Grand Ayatollah Abbas Mahfouzi (born 1928) is an Iranian Twelver Shia Marja.
He has studied in seminars of Qom, Iran under Ruhollah Khomeini, Grand Ayatollah Houssein Borujerdi and Mirza Hashem Amoli.

Biography

Grand Ayatollah Abbas Mahfouzi was born in Rudsar, Iran. He started the education of Quran in his childhood. For higher education he went to Rudsar Seminary. Later he travelled to Qom and studied in Seminars of Qom under Imam Khomeni, Houssein Borujerdi, Mirza Hashem Amoli, Mohammad Reza Golpaygani and Houssein Ali Montezari. He was a firm supporter of Khomeni and he supported Khomeini during 1979 Iranian Revolution.

See also
 List of current Maraji
 List of Ayatollahs
List of members in the First Term of the Council of Experts

References

External links
Resalah (Islamic Laws)

Twelvers
1928 births
Iranian grand ayatollahs
Living people